George Michael Meinhardt (November 24, 1897April 1, 1971) was an American football player.  A native of St. Louis, he played college football for the Saint Louis Billikens. He then played one season in the National Football League (NFL) as a center and guard for the St. Louis All-Stars in 1923.

References

1897 births
1971 deaths
Players of American football from St. Louis
St. Louis All-Stars players
Saint Louis Billikens football players